Nipissing was a federal electoral district that was represented in the House of Commons of Canada from 1896 to 2004. It was located in the northeastern part of Ontario, Canada.

When it was first created, the riding took in the eastern half of Northeastern Ontario, including the towns of North Bay and Sudbury. Before 1892, this region was part of the electoral district of Renfrew North.

It initially consisted of the temporary judicial district of Nipissing, and the townships of Head, Clara and Maria in the county of Renfrew, and a part of the district of Algoma.

In 1892, it was redefined to consist of the townships of Airey, Appleby, Awrey, Badgerow, Ballantyne, Biggar, Bishop, Blezard, Bonfield, Boulter, Bower, Boyd, Broder, Butt, Caldwell, Calvin, Cameron, Canisbay, Chisholm, Clara, Deacon, Devine, Dill, Dryden, Dunnet, Ferris, Field, Finlayson, Fitzgerald, French, Freswick, Grant, Hagar, Hawley, Head, Hugel, Hunter, Kirkpatrick, Lauder, Lister, Lorrain, Lyell, Maria, Mattawan, McCraney, McKim, McLaughlin, Merrick, Mulock, Murchison, Neelon, Olrig, Osler, Papineau, Paxton, Peck, Pentland, Phelps, Ratter, Robinson, Sabine, Springer, Widdifield and Wilkes, and a broad swath of northeastern Ontario between Georgian Bay and Hudson Bay/James Bay.

In 1903, it was redefined to consist of the territorial district of Nipissing, and the townships of Clara, Head and Maria in the county of Renfrew. In 1914, it was defined to consist of the territorial district of Nipissing, the eastern part of the territorial district of Sudbury, and the townships of Clara, Head and Maria in the county of Renfrew. In 1924, it was defined to consist of the southwest part of the territorial district of Nipissing, and the southeast part of the territorial district of Sudbury.

In 1947, it was defined to consist of the eastern part of the territorial district of Sudbury and the territorial district of Nipissing, excluding he townships of Ballantyne, Wilkes, Pentland, Boyd and Cameron and all townships south of them. Sudbury riding was created from the western portion of Nipissing.

In 1976, it was defined to consist of the northwest part of the Territorial District of Nipissing. In 1996, it was defined to consist of parts of the northeastern part of the Territorial District of Parry Sound, and the western part of the Territorial District of Nipissing.

The electoral district was abolished in 2003 when it was merged into Nipissing—Timiskaming riding.

Members of Parliament

This riding elected the following members of the House of Commons of Canada:

Electoral history

|}

|}

|}

|}

|}

On Mr. Gordon's resignation, 25 October 1911:
 

|}

|}

|}

|}

|}

|}

|}

|}

|}

|}

|}

|}

|}

|}

|}

On Mr. Garland's death, 14 March 1964:

|}

|}

|}

|}

|}

|}

|}

|}

|}

|}

|}

|}

External links
Library of Parliament website

Former federal electoral districts of Ontario
Politics of North Bay, Ontario